Mitchell High School, also known as Mitchell Road High School, is a public 9-12 school in Memphis, Tennessee, United States, located at 658 West Mitchell Road in South Memphis. Its enrollment of 1074 students is 100% Black, 0% White, and 0% Hispanic. The school is served by the Shelby County Schools district.

Notable alumni
 Jaylon Moore - NFL player
 Andre Turner - NBA player for the Los Angeles Lakers, Boston Celtics, Houston Rockets, Milwaukee Bucks, Los Angeles Clippers, Charlotte Hornets, Philadelphia 76ers, and Washington Bullets
 Thaddeus Young - NBA player for the Toronto Raptors 
 Moneybagg Yo - rapper
 Jeremiah Martin - professional basketball player for Śląsk Wrocław (basketball) of the PLK

References

Public high schools in Tennessee
Schools in Memphis, Tennessee